Yuri Vladimirovich Budylin (born 8 January 1982) is a former Russian professional football player.

Club career
He played 4 seasons in the Russian Football National League for FC Neftekhimik Nizhnekamsk.

Personal life
His younger brother Sergei Budylin was also a footballer.

References

1982 births
People from Nizhnekamsk
Living people
Russian footballers
Association football forwards
FC Neftekhimik Nizhnekamsk players
FC Orenburg players
FC Nosta Novotroitsk players
Sportspeople from Tatarstan